The gens Catilia was a Roman family of imperial times.  It is best known from Lucius Catilius Severus, consul in AD 120, and subsequently praefectus urbi.  He was the maternal proavus, or great-grandfather, of the emperor Marcus Aurelius.  At one time he hoped to obtain the empire himself, but he was removed from his office after expressing his disapprobation at the adoption of Antoninus Pius, who had been his colleague in the consulship.

Another Catilius Severus was a relative of the emperor Alexander Severus, and a member of his consilium.  He is described by the historian Lampridius as a vir omnium doctissimus, "the most learned of men."

See also
 List of Roman gentes

Footnotes

Roman gentes